Onar  may refer to:

 Ónar, in Norse mythology
 Onar, Ardabil, a town in Iran
 ONAR, a Greek musical group
 Onar (rapper), a Polish rapper

People with the name 
 Orhan Onar (1923–2009), Turkish judge
 Sıddık Sami Onar (1898–1972), Turkish academic
 Onar Onarheim (1910–1988), Norwegian politician